Amoghapasa inscription is an inscription inscribed on the back of pāduka Amoghapāśa as referred to in Padang Roco inscription.

In 1347, Adityawarman added this inscription on back of the statue proclaimed that the statue portrayed himself. Today the inscription is stored in the National Museum of Indonesia in Jakarta with inventory number D.198-6469 (the statue part).

References

Inscriptions in Indonesia
14th-century inscriptions
Singhasari
Srivijaya